Mai, or MAI, may refer to:

Names
 Mai (Chinese surname)
 Mai (Vietnamese surname)
 Mai (name)
 Mai (singer), J-Pop singer
 Iris Mai (born 1962), German chess master

Places
 Chiang Mai, largest city in northern Thailand
 Ma-i, a pre-Hispanic Philippine state
 Mai, Non Sung, Thailand

Organisations
 Manufacturers Association of Israel, an Israeli business organization
 Marina Abramović Institute, a performance art organization
 Market for Alternative Investment, a stock market for small/medium enterprises in Thailand
 Montreal Arts Interculturels, a multidisciplinary cultural organization in Montreal, Canada 
 Moscow Aviation Institute, an engineering and aviation university in Russia
 Motorsports Association of India, the FIA arm of Indian Motorsports

Science and Technology
 Machine augmented intelligence, use of technology to amplify and empower human thought and consciousness
 Mean annual increment, a measure of the average growth per year a tree or stand of trees has exhibited at a specified age
 Multiple Access Interference, a type of interference that occurs in code-division multiple access (CDMA) systems
 Mycobacterium avium-intracellulare infection, an atypical mycobacterial infection that was a common cause of wasting and death in the early AIDS Crisis

Transport
 MAI, the National Rail code for Maidenhead railway station in the county of Berkshire, UK
 Marine Accident Investigation, investigation of shipping accidents
 Myanmar Airways International, an airline from Myanmar (Burma)

Film and television
 Mai (1989 film), a Bhojpuri film
 Mai (2013 film), a Bollywood film featuring Asha Bhosle
 Mai (TV series), a 2022 Netflix India Original series

Other uses
 Mai Shiranui, a character appearing in the Fatal Fury and The King of Fighters series.
 Mai, a character from Avatar: The Last Airbender
 Mai FM, a New Zealand radio network
 "Mai", a song by Josh Groban song  on his album Awake Live
 mai, the ISO 639 code for the Maithili language spoken in India and Nepal
 Multilateral Agreement on Investment, a proposed OECD treaty for which negotiations were abandoned in 1998
 The Mai, fictional supernatural beings in The Nine Lives of Chloe King
 Mai Minakami, one of the 3 main characters of Nichijou

See also 
 Maij